Bhavindu Adhihetty (born 29 February 2000) is a Canadian cricketer. He played for Canada in the 2017 ICC World Cricket League Division Three tournament in May 2017. Prior to the Division 3 tournament, he was part of Canada's squad for the 2016 Under-19 Cricket World Cup. In July 2017, he was the captain of Canada's U19 squad for the 2017 ICC Americas Under-19 Championship.

In January 2018, he was named in Canada's squad for the 2018 ICC World Cricket League Division Two tournament. He made his List A debut for Canada on 8 February 2018. In April 2019, he was named in Canada's squad for the 2019 ICC World Cricket League Division Two tournament in Namibia.

References

External links
 

2000 births
Living people
Canadian cricketers
Canadian people of Sri Lankan descent
Cricketers from Colombo